Bethesda Game Studios is an American video game developer and a studio of ZeniMax Media based in Rockville, Maryland. The company was established in 2001 as the spin-off of Bethesda Softworks' development unit, with Bethesda Softworks itself retaining a publishing function. The studio is led by Todd Howard as executive producer, Ashley Cheng as managing director, and Angela Browder as studio director. Bethesda Game Studios operates three satellite studios, one in Montreal and two in Texas, and employs 420 people as of March 2021.

History 
In 2001, ZeniMax Media, the parent company of Bethesda Softworks, decided that the two operational units at Bethesda Softworks, development and publishing, should be split apart. Subsequently, Bethesda Softworks retained the publishing, while development staff was moved to the newly established Bethesda Game Studios. Initially, BGS had around 40 people.

By 2008, Bethesda Game Studios was considered one of the industry’s top developers on the reputation of the Elder Scrolls fantasy universe and the critically acclaimed Fallout 3. Bethesda had created a unique role for itself, “spending years to create massive, open-world, single-player RPGs — hardly a booming genre in the industry at large — to great success, bringing a once-niche PC genre to a broad multiplatform audience,” wrote Gamasutra in their year-end best of list.

On December 9, 2015, ZeniMax Media announced the formation of Bethesda Game Studios Montreal, a new Bethesda Game Studios location in Montreal, Quebec. Led by Yves Lachance, the former head of Behaviour Interactive, the studio was set to broaden the portfolio of games across all gaming platforms.

On March 9, 2018, Austin, Texas-based BattleCry Studios, another ZeniMax Media subsidiary, was rebranded as Bethesda Game Studios Austin.

On August 10, 2018, Escalation Studios was rebranded as Bethesda Game Studios Dallas.

Subsidiaries 
 Bethesda Game Studios Montreal in Montreal, Quebec; founded in December 2015.
 Bethesda Game Studios Austin in Austin, Texas; founded as BattleCry Studios, a subsidiary of ZeniMax, in October 2012, and re-arranged as part of BGS in March 2018.
 Bethesda Game Studios Dallas in Dallas, Texas; founded as Escalation Studios in 2007, acquired by ZeniMax in February 2017, and re-arranged as part of Bethesda Game Studios in August 2018.

Games developed 
Bethesda Game Studios has principally been involved in the development of role-playing video games with their The Elder Scrolls and Fallout series for consoles and personal computers, most of which have been commercially and critically successful.

In 2015, the studio entered into the mobile gaming market with Fallout Shelter based on the same franchise, which gained 50 million players by mid-2016. In February 2017, Howard said that they are in development of another mobile title following onto the success of Fallout Shelter. This was revealed in 2018 to be The Elder Scrolls: Blades.

In 2016, Howard confirmed that while they are developing The Elder Scrolls VI, it was still a long way to the game's release. Meanwhile, two other significant projects are in development which are expected to be released prior to The Elder Scrolls VI. On May 30, 2018, Fallout 76 was announced. On June 10, 2018, during Bethesda's E3 2018 conference, the other project in development was revealed to be the company's first new intellectual property in 25 years, Starfield. During the 2021 Xbox/Bethesda Games Showcase, Starfield was announced to be releasing exclusively for PC and Xbox Series X/S.  It has a planned release for the first half of 2023. On June 14, 2022, Howard confirmed that Fallout 5 would start development after the completion of The Elder Scrolls VI, with the latter currently in the pre-production phase of development.

Expansion packs

Awards 
 Gamasutra's Best of 2008 — Top Five Developer  
 2011 Spike Video Game Awards — Studio of the Year
 2015 The Game Awards — Developer of the Year (nominated)

References

External links 
 

2001 establishments in Maryland
American companies established in 2001
American corporate subsidiaries
Companies based in Rockville, Maryland
Spike Video Game Award winners
Video game companies based in Maryland
Video game companies established in 2001
Video game development companies
ZeniMax Media